Lake Tulos is a large freshwater lake in the Republic of Karelia, Russia, near Finnish border. It freezes up in November and stays icebound until May. There are many islands on the lake. The waters from the lake flow into the Lieksanjoki river that drains into lake Pielinen, Northern Karelia, Finland.

References

LTulos
Lakes of the Republic of Karelia